The Lutherkirche was a Protestant church named after Martin Luther in southern Königsberg, Germany.

History

The Lutherkirche was designed by the architect Friedrich Heitmann and located at the Viehmarkt, a market in the Haberberg quarter. The Neo-Renaissance church with Baroque decorations was built from 1907 to 1910 and dedicated on 18 December 1910. Although the Lutherkirche survived the 1944 Bombing of Königsberg and 1945 Battle of Königsberg, it was not used by the Soviet Union in Kaliningrad after World War II and was demolished in May 1976.

Gallery

References

1910 establishments in Germany
1945 disestablishments in Germany
20th-century Lutheran churches in Germany
Demolished churches in the Soviet Union
Former churches in Königsberg
Lutheran churches in Königsberg
Churches completed in 1910
Christian organizations established in 1910
Buildings and structures demolished in 1976